Engga Hostel is a 2023 Indian Tamil-language comedy drama streaming television series, which is an official remake of the Hindi-language series Hostel Daze. The series was directed by Sathish Chandrasekaran for Amazon Prime Video under the banner of The Viral Fever.

It stars Saranya Ravichandran, Avinaash Ramesh, Sacchin Nachiappan, Goutham Raj and Dravid Selvam in lead roles. The series follows six hostel friends in their first year students in campus and become roommates. Engga Hostel premiered on 27 January 2023 and consists of five episodes.

Cast
 Saranya Ravichandran as Rajathilagam
 Avinaash Ramesh as Cithappu
 Sacchin Nachiappan as Ajay
 Goutham Raj as Senthil
 Dravid Selvam as Jaya Veera Paandian
 Shamyuktha Viswanathan as Ahaana
 Sreelal as Jana
 Chu Khoy Sheng as Chang
 Abinash as Ramesh
 Idhaya as Suresh
 Seshu as Janitor
 Muruganatham as Boys Hostel Warden
 Vidur as Yuvaraj
 Jayakumar as Moorthy Sababathy
 Sharmila as Sumathy (Girls Hostel Warden)
 Swetha Kumara Ghuru as Aparna
 Arulmitha as Ranjani
 Poojitha Selvam as Revathi

Guest appearance
 Vaiyapuri as Security
 Rama

Episodes

Season 1

References

External links 
 Engga Hostel at Amazon Prime Video

Tamil-language web series
2023 Tamil-language television series debuts
Amazon Prime Video original programming
Tamil-language comedy television series
Tamil-language teen television series
Tamil-language romantic comedy television series
Television shows set in Tamil Nadu
Tamil-language television series based on Hindi-language television series